St. John's High School, Ranchi is a private Catholic secondary school for boys located in Purulia Road in Ranchi, Jharkhand, India. The school was founded by the Jesuits in 1887 and provides boys with an education from grades KG to 12.

History
The origin of St. John's dates back to July 1869 when Fr. Stockman came to Chaibasa from Calcutta, ten years after two Belgian and one English Jesuit began the Bengal Mission. The Munda tribals (adivasis) of the area were being exploited by tax collectors, landlords, and the British colonizers, and it was not until 1885, with the arrival of Fr. Constant Lievens, that productive contacts were made between the adivasis of the Chotanagpur plateau and the Jesuit missionaries. St. John’s was the first school founded by this mission, in 1887, and named the following year after Saint John Berchmans, a young Belgian Jesuit who had been canonised in Rome that year. 

St. John's is one of the oldest schools in the entire region, and had a year-long celebration of its centenary in 1989-90 which was attended by the Chief Minister of the state and hundreds of alumni.

Academics
The language of instruction is Hindi. The school is affiliated with the Jharkhand School Examination Board for class 10 examinations. It educates pupils from class 7 to class 10. Pupils of classes 1 to 6 are taught at St. John's Middle School, which is located on the same campus under the same administration.

St. John's High School has a sister school, St. Xavier's College, Ranchi, which is on an adjacent campus.

See also

 List of Jesuit schools
 List of schools in Jharkhand
 Violence against Christians in India

References

External links 
About us
Facebook
St. John's

Jesuit secondary schools in India
Schools in Colonial India
High schools and secondary schools in Jharkhand
Christian schools in Jharkhand
Private schools in Jharkhand
Schools in Ranchi
Educational institutions established in 1887
1887 establishments in India